Ruhollah Isari (born 2 June 1992)  is an Iranian professional futsal player. He is currently a member of Sunich in the Iranian Futsal Super League.

Honours

Club 
 Badamli - Naxçıvan Kuboku
 Champion (1): 2019–20 (Badamlı Naxçıvan)
 Tajikistan Futsal Super Cup
 Champion (1): 2021 (Soro Company)
 Tajikistan Futsal League
 Champion (1): 2021 (Soro Company)

References 

1992 births
Living people
People from Semnan Province
Iranian men's futsal players
Futsal forwards
Almas Shahr Qom FSC players
Ana Sanat FC players
Sunich FSC players
Iranian expatriate futsal players
Iranian expatriate sportspeople in Azerbaijan
21st-century Iranian people